A dot-com company, or simply a dot-com (alternatively rendered dot.com, dot com, dotcom or .com), is a company that does most of its business on the Internet, usually through a website on the World Wide Web that uses the popular top-level domain ".com". As of 2021, .com is by far the most used TLD, with almost half of all registrations. 

The suffix .com in a URL usually (but not always) refers to a commercial or for-profit entity, as opposed to a non-commercial entity or non-profit organization, which usually use .org. The name for the domain came from the word commercial, as that is the main intended use. Since the .com companies are web-based, often their products or services are delivered via web-based mechanisms, even when physical products are involved. On the other hand, some .com companies do not offer any physical products.

History

Origin of the .com domain (1985-1991) 

The .com top-level domain (TLD) was one of the first seven created when the Internet was first implemented in 1985; the others were .mil, .gov, .edu, .net, .int, and .org. The United States Department of Defense originally controlled the domain, but control was later transferred to the National Science Foundation as it was mainly used for non-defense-related purposes.

Beginning of online commerce and rise in valuation (1992-1999) 

With the creation of the World Wide Web in 1991, many companies began creating websites to sell their products. In 1994, the first secure online credit card transaction was made using the NetMarket platform. By 1995, over 40 million people were using the Internet. That same year, companies including Amazon.com and eBay were launched, paving the way for future e-commerce companies. At the time of Amazon's IPO in 1997, they were recording a 900% increase in revenue over the previous year. By 1998, with a valuation of over $14 billion, they were still not making a profit. The same phenomenon occurred with many other internet companiesventure capitalists were eager to invest, even when the companies in question were not profitable. In late 1999, the Nasdaq index reached a price-to-earnings ratio of over 200, more than double that of the Japanese asset price bubble at the beginning of the 1990s.

Burst of the dot-com bubble (2000-2001) 

A common indicator used to show the dramatic rise in the number of dot-com companies is the number of advertisements purchased at the Super Bowl. In 1999, only two internet companies bought advertisements, but that number reached 17 the following year. However, this number sharply decreased in 2001, with only 3 dot-com companies purchasing an advertising slot.

While the term can refer to present-day companies, it is also used about companies with this business model that came into being during the late 1990s with the rapid growth of the World Wide Web. Many such startups were formed to take advantage of the surplus of venture capital funding and were launched with thin business plans, sometimes with just an idea and a catchy name. The stated goal was often to "get big fast", i.e. to capture a majority share of whatever market was being entered. The exit strategy usually included an IPO and a large payoff for the founders. Others were existing companies that re-styled themselves as Internet companies, many of them legally changing their names to incorporate a .com suffix.

The stock market crash around 2000 that ended the dot-com bubble resulted in many failed and failing dot-com companies, which were referred to punningly as dot-bombs, dot-cons or dot-gones. Many of the surviving firms dropped the .com suffix from their names.

See also
Brick and mortar
Dot-com commercials during Super Bowl XXXIV
List of largest Internet companies

Notes and references

Dot-com bubble
 
E-commerce